Hunter House Museum was a museum in Calderwood, East Kilbride, South Lanarkshire, Scotland.

Description
Hunter House forms part of the original Long Calderwood Farm, purchased in the early 18th Century by John Hunter, father of William Hunter FRS (1718–1783) who became a leading anatomist, and John Hunter FRS (1728–1793), a physician and surgeon. The landholding itself has considerably earlier origins. Between the 1940s and 1960s the surrounding land was swallowed up by housing after East Kilbride was designated Scotland's first new town to alleviate serious housing issues, primarily in Glasgow.

The museum, which contained exhibits relating to the medical pioneer brothers and also covered the local history of East Kilbride, closed in February 2011 due to funding cuts in South Lanarkshire. The artefacts which were within the museum were removed for safekeeping. William Hunter's main collection can be found at the Hunterian Museum of Glasgow University. John Hunter's main collection is at the Royal College of Surgeons in London, England.

Calderwood Baptist Church, based at the adjacent property, was one of four applicants to use the building, and in November 2011 they took ownership. The building was renovated and reopened in 2013, being used for a multitude of purposes including a community cafe run by volunteers.

Gallery

See also
 List of Category A listed buildings in South Lanarkshire
 List of listed buildings in East Kilbride, South Lanarkshire

References

External links 
 Hunter House at www.visitlanarkshire.com
 Hunter House Museum website  (Last accessed 5 May 13).

Museums in South Lanarkshire
Biographical museums in Scotland
Local museums in Scotland
Medical museums in Scotland
Historic house museums in South Lanarkshire
Buildings and structures in East Kilbride
Category A listed buildings in South Lanarkshire
Defunct museums in Scotland
Listed houses in Scotland